The Rocky Mountains is an 1866 oil on canvas painting by a German-American painter Albert Bierstadt, a painter of Westward Expansion scenes in the latter 19th century. It is a landscape painted in a Luminist style.

Description 
Towering mountains are on the right and a lake is in the center; both are below a wispy, cloudy sky.

References 

1866 paintings
Paintings by Albert Bierstadt
Rocky Mountains
Deer in art
Water in art